Fernando Buesa Blanco (29 May 1946 – 22 February 2000) was a Spanish politician in the Basque Christian Democracy and in the Socialist Party of the Basque Country–Basque Country Left (PSE-EE) branch of the social democratic Spanish Socialist Workers' Party (PSOE). He was assassinated by ETA.

Biography

Born in 1946 in Bilbao, Spain, Buesa studied law in Madrid and Barcelona and practiced from 1970 to 1986 in Vitoria-Gasteiz. He served in the Vitoria-Gasteiz city council from 1983 to 1997, in the Basque Parliament from 1984 to 2000 and as Deputy General of Álava from 1987 to 1991. Buesa was also vice lehendakari (president of the Basque government) and minister of Education in a coalition PSE-Basque Nationalist Party Basque government from 1991 to 1994.

From this position, he steered the process that moved the Basque-language schools (ikastolak) into either the Basque public education network or the Basque chartered private education sector.

Fernando Buesa was married and had three children.

Assassination
At the time of his death Buesa was the leader of the PSE-EE in Álava and the PSE-EE spokesman in the Basque Parliament. He was killed by the separatist group ETA while he was walking through the university campus in Vitoria-Gasteiz on 22 February 2000. The car bombing also killed his bodyguard, the ertzaina (member of the Basque police) Jorge Díez Elorza.

Legacy
His assassination inspired a well received documentary by the Basque filmmaker  titled .

The home arena of the Vitoria-Gasteiz Baskonia basketball team, formerly known as Araba Arena, was renamed Fernando Buesa Arena after his death.

Honours
 Civil Order of Alfonso X the Wise, Grand Cross, 25 February 2005 (posthumous)

See also
List of unsolved murders

References

External links 
 
Fernando Buesa Foundation

1946 births
2000 deaths
Politicians from Bilbao
Spanish Socialist Workers' Party politicians
Basque Christian Democracy politicians
Deputies General of Álava
Members of the 2nd Basque Parliament
Members of the 3rd Basque Parliament
Members of the 4th Basque Parliament
Members of the 5th Basque Parliament
Members of the 6th Basque Parliament
Municipal councillors in the Basque Country (autonomous community)
Assassinated Spanish politicians
Deaths by car bomb in Spain
Male murder victims
People killed by ETA (separatist group)
People murdered in Spain
Spanish terrorism victims
Unsolved murders in Spain
Recipients of the Civil Order of Alfonso X, the Wise